Akksjøen is a lake in Nordre Land Municipality in Innlandet county, Norway.

See also
List of lakes in Norway

References

Nordre Land
Lakes of Innlandet